Haystack Mountain is a mountain in the north-east of New South Wales, Australia. The closest large town is Kyogle. Sub tropical rainforest on the mountain contains many species of plants, including the black booyong and yellow carabeen.

See also

List of mountains of New South Wales

References

Haystack Mountain
Forests of New South Wales
Northern Rivers